Bayswater railway station is a station in Bayswater, a suburb of Perth, Western Australia. It is on the Midland line and Airport line, which are part of the Transperth commuter rail network. It has an island platform, accessed via a pedestrian underpass and a level crossing. The station is only partially accessible due to a large platform gap and steep access ramps to the platform. Services on each line run every 12 minutes during peak and every 15 minutes between peak. The station is served by three regular bus routes.

The station first opened in 1896, with two side platforms, and an adjacent goods yard. It served as the junction station for the Belmont spur line between 1896 and 1956. The station was rebuilt as an island platform just to the north in the late 1960s when the Midland line was converted from narrow gauge to dual gauge; the standard gauge trains were unable to fit between the side platforms. Around that time, the goods yard closed.

A reconstruction of the station began in January 2021 as part of the state government's Metronet project, with the new station located slightly to the south. This is in order to increase the number of platforms to four, and raise the height of the nearby  low-clearance Bayswater Subway to  so that tall vehicles no longer strike it frequently, as is the case currently. The first half of the new station is planned to open in September 2023 following the old station's closure on 31 March. The station became a junction station again when the Airport line opened on 9 October 2022; the Morley–Ellenbrook line will also split at Bayswater when it opens in 2024.

Description
Bayswater station is in Bayswater, a suburb of Perth, Western Australia. It is located between Whatley Crescent to the south, and Railway Parade to the north, in the heart of the Bayswater town centre. Just to the west is the Bayswater Subway, a railway bridge over King William Street and Coode Street. The adjacent stations are Meltham station towards Perth, Ashfield station towards Midland and Redcliffe station towards High Wycombe.

The station consists of a single island platform with two platform faces. The tracks through the station are dual gauge. Transperth services operate on narrow gauge; standard gauge trains such as the Indian Pacific and Transwa rural train services do not stop at the station. At the west end of the platform is a pedestrian subway, accessible from the platform by a ramp. The subway's exit to the south has been blocked off since January 2021 due to construction on a station rebuild. The subway's exit to the north is still accessible. There is also a pedestrian level crossing to the east of the station, which provides access north and south. The station has a small shelter, a transit officer booth, and a bike shelter.

History

On 1 March 1881, the Fremantle–Guildford railway line was opened. This railway was soon extended to Midland Junction, and the part between Perth and Midland is now the Midland line. It passed through what is now Bayswater, but at the time, there was no development in the area. The railway line reduced what was previously a several-hour long trip from Bayswater to Perth or Guildford to twenty minutes. The railway line provided an opportunity for development in the area. Development first occurred in Bayswater in July 1885, when the Bayswater Estate was placed onto the property market. The estate centred on Coode Street and King William Street, the first roads in Bayswater. An advertisement for the estate used the railway as one of its selling points. This advertisement was also the first mention of the need for a railway station in Bayswater.

By 1888, there was a railway siding in Bayswater, but no proper railway station. In 1896, the railway line was duplicated. With this, came the construction of Bayswater station, at the centre of the Bayswater Estate. The station consisted of two side platforms connected by a footbridge. The station also had sidings for goods. It was located on the slope of a hill, allowing the nearby construction of the Bayswater Subway later. The station became the first major employer in Bayswater, needing staff to operate the station, goods yard, and to direct traffic. In 1897, the station served a population of approximately 400. From the opening of Bayswater station, it was the junction station for the Belmont spur line to the nearby Ascot Racecourse.

Access to the station was an issue over the decades since it was constructed. At first, the only way into the station was from the south near Slade Street, and the station yard did not have good access. In 1898, the Bayswater Road Board asked the Commissioner of Railways, Frederick Henry Piesse, if a pathway into the station could be made from King William Street, and if a pathway could be made from the goods yard to Coode Street. The commissioner agreed to construct roads from Drake Street to Coode Street, from Slade Street to King William Street, and from Drake Street through the goods yard. He also agreed to have a footbridge be constructed over the goods yard to Rose Avenue to the north. Access issues continued though, with the footbridge not actually constructed, and the access pathways being sub-optimal. In 1932, the station was described as the "worst equipped from Midland Junction to Fremantle". In 1935, road board members described the approach to the station as in a "rough and disgraceful condition, and that part of it was sometimes underwater".

The Belmont spur line was closed in 1956. During the late 1960s, Bayswater station was rebuilt just north of the previous station, as an island platform. This was because the Midland line was being converted from narrow gauge to dual gauge, and side platforms were not compatible with the standard gauge trains. This was also the end of goods trains serving Bayswater station, as the goods yard was shut down.

Second rebuild

Proposals
Following the 2014 Forrestfield–Airport Link announcement, which revealed the Airport line would branch off from the Midland line east of Bayswater, residents began lobbying the Government of Western Australia to upgrade Bayswater station. The only works planned at Bayswater station as part of the Forrestfield–Airport Link were minor works to bring the station into compliance with the Disability Discrimination Act 1992. Local residents said it was a missed opportunity to not upgrade the station.

In the lead up to the 2016 Australian federal election, the Labor Party promised to spend $1 million on a structure plan to look at rebuilding the station underground, in addition to the $120,000 that was already spent by the City of Bayswater on the structure plan. Federal Labor candidate Tim Hammond said that the tunnelling works for the Forrestfield–Airport Link presented a “once-in-a-lifetime” opportunity for rebuilding Bayswater station underground as well. Labor ended up losing that election, and so the $1 million was not spent on the structure plan.

Before the 2017 Western Australian state election, the Labor Party promised $40 million for upgrading Bayswater station as part of their Metronet project, in addition to the $7 million that was already allocated to the station from the Forrestfield–Airport Link budget. They said that sinking the station was an option they would consider. Labor later won the election, setting into motion the planning for the Bayswater station upgrade.

Planning
The scope and constraints for the Bayswater station rebuild were revealed on 8 April 2018. The project's budget had increased to $86 million; construction was scheduled to start in 2019, and finish by the end of 2020, before the opening of the Forrestfield–Airport Link. The platforms will also be relocated west to pass over King William Street/Coode Street. This allows the station to be on a straight section of track, keeping the gap between the platform and train to a minimum. This also allows there to be station entrances on both sides of those roads, improving access to the station. The scope also includes a turnback siding between Bayswater and Meltham stations, to be used during partial line shutdowns.

The elevated station was planned to have two platform faces, with contingency for expansion to four platform faces if needed for the Morley–Ellenbrook line. The new station was planned to be built immediately south of the rail corridor and existing station, to minimise the impact on services during construction. The two extra platforms were planned to be built where the existing station is, after the new station became operational and the old station is demolished. It was later confirmed in August 2019 that the two additional platform faces would be included in the project's scope, as the Morley–Ellenbrook line was confirmed to branch off from the Midland line at Bayswater. This will make Bayswater station the largest railway station in Perth outside the Perth central business district. Sinking the station was ruled out, as it would require the rebuild or closure of Meltham station; it would cause major disruption to the Midland line, with services cancelled for a significant amount of time; the design of the Forrestfield–Airport Link tunnel portal in Bayswater precluded sinking Bayswater station; and the regional diesel trains that run along the Midland line, such as the Indian Pacific and The Prospector, would require complex ventilation in a tunnel.

Following the reveal of the scope and constraints, Metronet undertook what they said was the most extensive community consultation process for a railway station development in Perth, which included the formation of a community advisory group for the concept design, the survey of 972 people, and hosting community drop-in sessions, which 300 people attended. Following the community consultation, a concept design was revealed on 1 December 2018. The project cost was increased to $146 million. Aside from the parameters previously revealed, the concept design included a redesign of the roads around the station, and a public space north of the station where community events could take place. The redesigned road network includes linking Whatley Crescent directly to Beechboro Road South by a second road under the railway, east of the station. The section of Whatley Crescent around the station would be levelled, to allow it to pass under the railway. This meant that it would be cut off from the eastern part of Whatley Crescent. The reworked road network enabled buses to terminate and loop around at the station without having to use local residential streets, something that the existing station did not have. All car parking bays on the south side of the station were planned to be removed, leaving just the small amount on the north side.

Local residents and community groups criticised the concept design for the size of the bus interchange, the disconnection of Whatley Crescent, the need to remove significant trees, and that the station would be surrounded on all sides by roads. Community group Future Bayswater proposed an alternative road layout, that had the intersection of Whatley Crescent, Railway Parade, King William Street, and Coode Street underneath the station overpass, removing the need for Beechboro Road South to pass under the railway to the east of the station. The alternative design also had Whatley Crescent east of King William Street be a shared space or shared street, allowing local residents to drive through but helping to allay the problem that the station is surrounded on four sides by roads.

A request for proposal was released on 11 April 2019 for the design and construction of the station. At that stage, contract award and the beginning of construction were still planned for the end of 2019. The request for proposal closed the following month. In August 2019, two proponents were shortlisted for receiving the contract to design and built the station: the Better Bayswater Alliance, consisting of Georgiou Group and Lendlease, and the Evolve Bayswater Alliance, consisting of Coleman Rail and Decmil.

Early works and further planning

Early works on the station began in late 2019, with the relocation of underground cables in the vicinity of the station. In January 2020, a kurrajong tree was relocated by a crane from Bayswater station to Bert Wright Park. The tree, which was 80 years old at the time, was deemed too significant to cut down, so it was instead relocated. The process started in May 2019, when arborists started trimming the tree's roots. The relocation took place on 9 January 2020, using one crane to lift the  tree and another crane to move the tree  down King William Street to the park.

To offset the 180 car parking bays planned to be removed from Bayswater station, 100 parking bays were added to Meltham station, and 83 parking bays were added to Ashfield station. Parking was also made free at Ashfield, as that station is in fare zone two, as opposed to Bayswater and Meltham in fare zone one. To make those stations more attractive to use, starting in July 2019, stopping patterns were removed on the Midland line, making all trains stop at those stations. The $1.6 million contract to design and build those carparks was awarded to Westforce Construction in October 2019. Construction on the carparks started in February 2020 and was completed in October 2020.

On 9 April 2020, Evolve Bayswater was announced to be the preferred proponent. The budget was increased to $253 million as well, due to the additional platforms being included in the project's scope. The contract was signed with Evolve Bayswater Alliance on 19 May 2020. Decmil took a $25 million stake in the project, and Coleman Rail took the rest. On the same day as the signing of the contract, new and more detailed concept designs were released. The concept designs were criticised by local residents, saying it differed significantly from the curvy and elegant original concept design from 2018. They said the design looked like a "bulky freeway overpass", and compared the design of the platform shelters to a Bunnings trestle table. The lack of escalators was also criticised, although the design did include lifts. Paul Shanahan, chairman of Future Bayswater, said the design lacked architectural merit and had become a "social media joke". Opposition transport spokesperson Libby Mettam said that "despite months of community consultation over the design and aesthetics, the final plan has been
compared to four trestle tables slapped on top of a freeway overpass". Even the member for Maylands and government MP Lisa Baker privately criticised the design to Rita Saffioti, the Minister for Transport.

A new design was released in October 2020, which included escalators, redesigned platform shelters, and a corrugated iron finish on the bridge designed to mimic the metal fluting on a Transperth A-series train. The new shelters in the design cover 70% of the platform, and have vertical screens to reduce wind. The design has one escalator to each pair of platforms, in addition to the two stairs and lifts to each platform. Community members said the design was an improvement on the May 2020 concept design, but criticism of the road layout had yet to be addressed by the government.

Construction

Just before Christmas 2020, the development application for the station received conditional approval from the Western Australian Planning Commission (WAPC). This allowed construction to commence in January 2021. During that month, the number of lanes on Whatley Crescent was reduced, and on-street parking was removed. The Principal Shared Path parallel to the railway line was relocated onto Whatley Crescent. The closure of the carparks south of the railway occurred after that, and then earthworks began. Local businesses complained about the lack of parking, saying that had gone down since the removal of parking on Whatley Crescent. In May 2021, Metronet provided $236,000 to the City of Bayswater to build 20 temporary parking bays.

Vibrations and loud noise have been an issue during construction, especially during the piling works between April and July 2021. Many local residents have been unable to sleep and have had cracks appear in their houses. Evolve Bayswater provided a small compensation payment to some residents. Residents and businesses have also made complaints about construction staff using parking meant for customers, although the Public Transport Authority has debunked those claims. Construction staff have been verbally abused by the general public. Surveys undertaken by the Public Transport Authority show that the Bayswater station project has an 80% approval rating in the area, however there is a small, vocal group of people who are negative about it.

The installation of bridge pillars began in September 2021. The first two out of 52 bridge beams were installed in late February 2022. More bridge beams were installed in the months following that, and by 13 April 2022, twelve beams had been installed. By the end of July, all bridge beams for the first stage of the project were in place. The Airport line opened on 9 October 2022. In November 2022, Firm Construction, a subcontractor that was responsible for the construction of the station building, was stripped of its contract after the state government intervened. Firm Construction was responsible for approximately ten percent of the overall project. Firm Construction went into voluntary administration days later. The state government said that the collapse of the subcontractor would not impact the overall timeframe of the project.

The first half of the new station was originally going to open following a shutdown of the line from 23 September to 16 October 2022. In August, this was delayed to January 2023 as a result of supply chain disruptions, with the possibility of it being delayed again to April 2023 left open. In February 2023, it was confirmed that the Airport and Midland lines will close between 31 March and 26 April. The current Bayswater station will permanently close at the start of the shutdown and the new station is planned to open in September 2023. A free shuttle bus will run between Bayswater and Meltham while the station is closed and a community event to celebrate the Bayswater Bridge will be held on 30 April. The shutdown will involve replacing  of track, expanding the Leake Street pedestrian underpass and continuing work on the new bridge. Following that, the old station and bridge will be demolished.

Metronet East Redevelopment Area

In June 2019, DevelopmentWA began the process of expanding the Midland Redevelopment Area to include the areas surrounding Bayswater station and High Wycombe station, renaming it the Metronet East Redevelopment Area. DevelopmentWA said the purpose of the redevelopment area was to "maximise development opportunities arising from the station upgrades and help create a well-designed and connected community hub." The boundaries of the area were formally established in May 2020. A draft redevelopment scheme for Metronet East was released in August 2020. The redevelopment scheme was formally adopted in May 2021, transferring planning authority from the City of Bayswater and the WAPC to DevelopmentWA.

Services

Bayswater station is served by the Midland line and the Airport line on the Transperth network. The Midland line goes between Midland station and Perth station, continuing past Perth as the Fremantle line. The Airport line goes between High Wycombe station via Perth Airport, Bayswater station and Perth station to Claremont station. It will also be served by the Morley–Ellenbrook line when that opens in late-2024. Services on that line will go between Ellenbrook station and Perth station via Bayswater.

Midland line and Airport line trains each stop at Bayswater station every 12 minutes during peak on weekdays, and every 15 minutes during the day outside peak and on weekends and public holidays. This makes for a combined peak frequency of a train every 6 minutes between Bayswater and Claremont. Late at night, trains on each line are half-hourly or hourly. When the Morley–Ellenbrook line opens, services on that line will stop every 12 minutes during peak. It is envisioned that by 2031, services on each of the three lines will be every 10 minutes during peak. The station saw 527,269 passengers in the 2013–14 financial year.

Bayswater station has three regular bus routes adjacent to it: route 48, and routes 998 and 999, also known as the CircleRoute. Routes 48, 998, and 999 use bus stops on Coode Street; route 48 diversions and route 901 (rail replacement service) use stops on Railway Parade. There are approximately 300 bus-train transfers per day. The station does not have a bus interchange, only on-street bus stops, and the road geometry of the area does not allow for services to loop around, which constrains the bus routes that can serve Bayswater station. The station rebuild as part of Metronet will change the road layout so that buses can circle the station, and terminate there. As the only two stations on the Midland line with bus interchanges – Midland and Bassendean – are at capacity, it is anticipated that more bus services will service Bayswater station after the station rebuild.

References

External links

Bayswater Station information page from Transperth
Bayswater Station Upgrade from Metronet

Bayswater, Western Australia
Midland line, Perth
Railway stations in Australia opened in 1896
Railway stations in Perth, Western Australia
Airport line, Perth
Morley–Ellenbrook line